Corydon Township is a township in Wayne County, Iowa.

History
Corydon Township was given its name by a county judge who hailed from Corydon, Indiana.

References

Townships in Wayne County, Iowa
Townships in Iowa